Aoplonemella is a genus of true bugs in the family Miridae, containing a single known species, Aoplonemella festiva.

References

Monotypic Hemiptera genera
Miridae genera
Orthotylini